Big Cedar Hollow is a valley in McDonald County in the U.S. state of Missouri.

Big Cedar Hollow was named for the cedar timber it contains.

References

Valleys of McDonald County, Missouri
Valleys of Missouri